"Infinity Wars" is a 2018 comic book storyline published by Marvel Comics as a follow-up to "Infinity Countdown."

Premise
The premise involves the heroes and villains of the Marvel Universe deal with the outcome of the search for the new Infinity Gems (now renamed Infinity Stones).

In Infinity Wars #3 ("Infinity Warps"), Requiem (Gamora) successfully gathers the Infinity Stones to use them in a more creative fashion than her father Thanos, reducing the universe’s lifeforms in half by combining any two given characters into one new individual. However, the result is unintended: only the reality around the heroes of Earth is warped and transported inside Soulworld where Devondra, a cosmic entity dwelling at the heart of the Soul Stone, waits to feed.

Plot

Loki arrives at a library in Omnipotence City, where he finds that none of its multiversal stories list him as being a hero. The timekeeper Flowa directs him to a book about the different universes, but finds pages are missing. Loki enlists Flowa's help to visit the God Quarry. Meanwhile, Adam Warlock senses the corruption of the Soul World and enlists Doctor Strange to help. Doctor Strange, who has the Time Stone, tries to get Adam Warlock to give up the Soul Stone. Before leaving, Adam Warlock warns Doctor Strange that Kang the Conqueror is not the only one looking for the Infinity Stones. On Chitauri Prime, Thanos prepares to rally the Chitauri to find all of the reformed Infinity Stones, but a shadowy figure appears behind Thanos and stabs him. Recognizing the identity of the female from her sword, Thanos defends himself before the figure proceeds to brutally behead him and destroy the Chitauri armada with poison gas. The figure destroys Thanos' gauntlet, claiming that her future is blank as the past is dead.

Gamora approaches Star-Lord (who is in possession of the Power Stone), Rocket Raccoon, and Groot at Cebulski's bar at Knowhere, where Star-Lord tries to get Gamora to return to the Guardians of the Galaxy. Doctor Strange gathers the other wielders of the Infinity Stones (Star-Lord, Adam Warlock, Black Widow's clone, Captain Marvel, and Turk Barrett) in Central Park, where they discover that Thanos is dead. Loki and Flowa arrive at the God's Quarry where the Coven that guards it bursts into flames as they declare that the end of infinity is here. An alternate Loki emerges from a portal, wielding Mjolnir and the Infinity Stones. Before being drawn back to his reality and killed by a Souleater, the alternate tells Loki that he needs the Infinity Stones to breach the reality and defeat Devondra and Requiem. Turk discovers that Star-Lord's Power Stone is fake as his posse of villains start a fight. When Iron Man and Thor arrive to break up the fight, Iron Man is struck by purple lightning as the mysterious assailant that killed Thanos arrives demanding the Infinity Stones, identifying herself as Requiem. Rocket shoots off Requiem's mask, revealing her to be Gamora, who stole the Power Stone at Knowhere. When Star-Lord tries to reason with Gamora, Doctor Strange warns him that the Power Stone is in the hilt of her sword. Star-Lord refuses to kill her, and Gamora sorrowfully claims that nothing ever dies as she impales him with her sword.

In the distant past, Gamora talks to Thanos about his mortality. In the recent past after killing her father, Gamora can still hear his voice in her mind. Back in the present, Doctor Strange uses the Time Stone to heal Star-Lord and teleports Turk Barrett to another dimension, where Doctor Strange persuades Turk to hand him the Mind Stone. The others continue their fight with Gamora who is then plagued by an apparition of Thanos. Captain Marvel tries to take Gamora down only to have the Reality Stone stolen from her as Gamora uses it to fool the Avengers into thinking that the two swapped places. Captain America sees through the deception after Doctor Strange restrains the fake Captain Marvel. Gamora uses the Reality Stone to partially fuse Captain America and Doctor Strange, gets the Mind Stone and the Time Stone, and beheads Adam Warlock. She then uses the Time Stone to freeze time so that she can steal the Space Stone from Black Widow before claiming the Soul Stone. Gamora opens the portal to Soul World where she merges with her elderly counterpart. As Gamora plans to rebalance the Soul Stone so that Devondra can feed, Loki arrives with Flowa and offers his counsel to Gamora.

Using the Mind Stone, Gamora reads Loki's mind and learns of his visit to the God's Quarry. She sets out to investigate the boundary at the Quarry of Creation. To neutralize any opposition and to feed Devondra, Gamora traps the Soul World's inhabitants in a pocket dimension called Warp World. This pocket dimension merges some of the characters into one individual: Iron Man and Thor are merged into Iron Hammer, Captain America and Doctor Strange are merged into Soldier Supreme, Scarlet Witch and X-23 are merged into Weapon Hex, Spider-Man and Moon Knight are merged into Arachknight, and Black Panther and Ghost Rider are merged into Ghost Panther. Gamora travels with Flowa to the God's Quarry and begins to dig into the Quarry of Creation. It is revealed that Gamora has trapped Loki in the Soul Stone where he tries to enlist a hybrid of Wolverine and Emma Frost called Diamond Patch to find Adam Warlock and prevent the end of the world and Warp World.

Diamond Patch has deduced that Gamora copied the real world and that a set of Infinity Stones exists somewhere in Soul World. He sends a telepathic message in a bottle to a future Wolverine that will one day wield the Phoenix Force, who travels back in time to give them the Power Stone. This enables Diamond Patch to split back into Wolverine and Emma Frost. In an unnamed adjacent reality, Moondragon and Phyla-Vell fail to defeat Gamora and flee to Earth-616. Emma Frost takes Loki to Warp World to recruit those who would wield an Infinity Stone. Loki and Emma Frost find their candidates after splitting Ms. Kang back into Ms. Marvel and Kang the Conqueror, and splitting Little Monster back into Hulk and Ant-Man. With this team of "Cosmic Avengers" assembled, they find Adam Warlock and suggest they exit the Soul World only for Adam Warlock to declare that they need to defeat Devondra first. They round up Arachknight, Ghost Panther, Green Widow (a combination of Black Widow and She-Hulk), Iron Hammer, Man-Thing-Thang-Thoom (a combination of Man-Thing and Fin Fang Foom), Moon Squirrel (a combination of Moon Girl and Squirrel Girl) and Tippysaurus (a combination of Tippy Toe and Devil Dinosaur), Soldier Supreme, Weapon Hex, and Fantastic Two members Mister Invisible (a combination of Mister Fantastic and Invisible Woman) and Hot Rocks (a combination of Human Torch and Thing) as well as Art Douglas/Drax, who previously existed in a duel state. Back in the real world, Gamora has found an impenetrable barrier beneath the God's Quarry. After an attempt to breach out of Earth-616, she is confronted by the Council of Watchers.

Gamora has been unsuccessfully using the Infinity Blade to cut through the barrier at the God's Quarry while being watched by the Council of Watchers. She states that nothing gets out without her permission, that being when Devondra is done devouring what's inside. In the Soul Stone, Loki's group and the warped heroes fight Devondra as Adam Warlock and Soldier Supreme arrive, with the latter stating that he doesn't want to be unmade. Adam Warlock states that if they can defeat Devondra, Warp World could still exist.  As Loki's group traverses through the wastelands, they find a younger Gamora playing with stones. Emma Frost and Ms. Marvel talk her and learn that she is in a safe place that she does not want her to leave. After persuading the younger Gamora to lend them the Infinity Stones, they are divided among the heroes based on their abilities: Emma gets the Power Stone, Hulk gets the Space Stone, Ant-Man gets the Time Stone, Kang the Conqueror gets the Reality Stone, Loki gets the Soul Stone, and Ms. Marvel gets the Mind Stone. Back in the real world, alternate versions of Phylla-Vel and Moondragon attack Gamora for destroying their universe. As Gamora defends herself, Loki portals the heroes to the fight. Gamora attacks Emma Frost with the Infinity Blade, but it shatters on her diamond skin, giving Ms. Marvel the opportunity to remove this Power Stone from the broken weapon. Hulk and Kang the Conqueror confront Gamora with their respective Space and Reality Stones. As she fights Kang's army, Gamora claims that she will remake the universe once Devondra is done devouring the old one so that there will be no suffering. Influenced by Loki's own agenda, Ant-Man steals the Reality and Space Stones, while Loki grabs some rocks on the ground and starts replacing the reclaimed Infinity Stones before the alternate Phylla-Vel and Moondragon can finish off Gamora. After teleporting them away, Loki tells Kang and Emma Frost that he now has the Infinity Stones. As Loki breaks down the barrier, Flowa is surprised with what she sees and writes it down. When Loki enters another universe, he finds that the Infinity Stones do not work here. He sees a group of Celestials and calls them the "puppet masters." Inside Warp World, Soldier Supreme notices that Devondra keeps regenerating as Adam Warlock finds that Gamora and the alternate Phylla-Vel and Moondragon are now in the Soul Stone. Elsewhere in the Soul Stone, Art Douglas is driving with his wife Yvette as he tells her that he was having visions of total destruction. They crash into a tree with a human face (a hybrid of Star-Lord and Groot called Peet). Art is grabbed by Peet and flies away as he promises Yvette that he will return.

In the other universe, Loki is shown his future by the Celestials. Disenchanted by what he sees, Loki gives the Stones back to his former teammates and leaves with Flowa for Omnipotence City. Back in Soul World, Soldier Supreme defeats Gamora and demands information on how to defeat Devondra. Gamora states that there is no defeating Devondra and that the universe will be in entropy without the Infinity Stones. Peet arrives with Art Douglas and saves Gamora. The former members of Loki's group arrive and Ms. Marvel gives Art the Soul Stone. Gamora states that Devondra can't be defeated in the Soul Stone. Adam Warlock plans to copy the souls in Warp World in order to bring them and Devondra into the real world as Hulk punches Devondra into the hole leading to the real world. Adam Warlock returns the Guardians to their normal state while separating Drax's Destroyer half from his Arthur Douglas half. Once the copies are made with the help of the Infinity Stones, Emma Frost wipes the memories of the incident. Drax and Arthur Douglas work together to split the portal in two portals and hold it open while the others enter. The Infinity Stones bore through the dimensions until Devondra's universe collapses. Everyone else awakens in Egypt. Gamora sees the Infinity Stones as she is confronted by the alternate Phylla-Vell and Moondragon. Star-Lord persuades them to spare Gamora. When most of those present start to go for the Infinity Stones, Adam Warlock grabs the Time Stone, freezes time, and states that the Infinity Stones must decide the outcome. After time resumes, Star-Lord notices that Gamora is gone as Adam Warlock sent her to a location so that she can redeem herself. Everyone leaves Egypt as Star-Lord laments about Drax's sacrifice. Back in Warp World, Arthur is living happily with Yvette as they see a newspaper about the formation of the Avengers/Defenders. At their citadel, its members Iron Hammer, Soldier Supreme, and Weapon Hex are holding a press conference announcing the formation of their team. In a desert somewhere, Gamora finds a cocoon and tears it open to find a younger version of Magus inside as she has a brief vision of a sneering Thanos. As they leave, Magus tells Gamora that he was sent by a "friend." In Omnipotence City, Flowa finishes writing in her tome, leaving some pages blank just in case of some time-travel elements. When Loki asks Flowa to accompany him on his next quest to find an answer to Adam Warlock's actions, she declines and places the book she has written on a shelf. In a desert somewhere, Adam Warlock stares at the stars and draws a symbol in the sand claiming that a part of him is missing, echoing the beginning of Gamora's journey to become Requiem in the first place.

Issues

Main plot
 Infinity Wars #1-6

Tie-ins
 Asgardians of the Galaxy #1-5
 Doctor Strange Vol. 5 #3
 Infinity Wars Prime #1
 Infinity Wars: Fallen Guardian #1
 Infinity Wars: Infinity #1
 Infinity Wars: Sleepwalker #1-4

Involved but not listed as tie-ins
 Thanos Legacy #1 answers some questions of Infinity Wars Prime.
 Avengers (2018) #10 shows Loki confronting the Celestials in "the far reaches of space".
 Venom (2018) #8 reveals that the Maker is aware of, and observing, the Infinity Wars along other events.

Infinity Warps
 Infinity Warps: Arachknight #1-2
 Infinity Warps: Ghost Panther #1-2
 Infinity Warps: Infinity Warps #1-2
 Infinity Warps: Iron Hammer #1-2
 Infinity Warps: Soldier Supreme #1-2
 Infinity Warps: Weapon Hex #1-2

Aftermath
 Wolverine: Infinity Watch #1-5

Secret Warps
 Secret Warps: Soldier Supreme Annual #1
 Secret Warps: Weapon Hex Annual #1
 Secret Warps: Ghost Panther Annual #1
 Secret Warps: Arachknight Annual #1
 Secret Warps: Iron Hammer Annual #1

Collected editions

Reception
The book received a 3.3/5 on Goodreads based on 81 reviews. ComicBookWire gave it a 7.0, and the review: "This comic is interesting from start to finish, with very few lackluster plot points, and has visually pleasing artwork to back up this story."

Comic Book Resources gave it an 8.0, calling it, "very much like The Infinity War, it is worth it." Terrence Public reviews gave it a 10.0, saying it had "a great plot. Sometimes too great, and doesn't take itself too seriously."

References

External links 
 

2018 in comics
2018 comics debuts
Comic book limited series